Simbi Khali  (born April 28, 1971), sometimes credited as Simbi Kali Williams, is an American actress and singer best known for her role as Nina Campbell on the NBC sitcom 3rd Rock from the Sun.
Her credits include the television show Martin and the feature films Vampire in Brooklyn, A Thin Line Between Love and Hate, and Plump Fiction. On stage, Khali has appeared in Colored Museum, For Colored Girls..., A Midsummer Night's Dream, and Troilus and Cressida.  She also had a career in voice acting, most notably Varesh Ossa in the video game Guild Wars Nightfall, and Amanda in the video game Detroit: Become Human.

Early life
Khali was born in Jackson, Mississippi, the youngest of five girls and two boys. When she was two, Khali's family moved to Chicago's South Side. Khali started singing at a young age.

She became interested in theatre at Chicago's ETA Creative Arts Foundation. At age 15, she went to live in Alabama with her sister, Hamidah Elmore, and experienced her first "onstage rush" in a high school talent show.

For her junior and senior years of high school, she moved to Washington, DC, to live with her mother Amerah Shabazz. She transferred to the Duke Ellington School of the Arts, where she committed to acting. Khali won admission to the California Institute of the Arts and  graduated in 1993 with a degree in acting.

Career
At a performance during her senior year at Cal Arts, she was spotted and signed by a talent agent. That summer, she performed as part of a Ben & Jerry's troupe that visited hospitals and other charities, passing out samples of ice cream. It paid well and gave her time to audition, leading to her first job in the FOX sitcom Martin.

From 1993 to 1997, she played Sheneneh's vocal best friend in Martin. From 1996 to 2001, she played Nina Campbell in the NBC sitcom 3rd Rock from the Sun. She was initially cast a recurring character, but was bumped to a main character in season 3.

In 2016, Khali's career, performances, character portrayals and other accolades were officially recognized and commended by the Mississippi legislature.

Personal life
Khali initially met actor Cress Williams at a Los Angeles club in 1994, then again in the fall of 1999 while filming the BET movie Masquerade. Within a month they were engaged, and they married in Malibu in the fall of 2000. They divorced amicably in 2011. 

They have two children: son Jory Holmes Khali Williams and daughter Courtney CoCo Khali Williams.

Filmography

Television

Film

Video games

References

External links

1971 births
African-American actresses
American television actresses
Living people
Actors from Jackson, Mississippi
Actresses from Mississippi
Actresses from Chicago
20th-century American actresses
21st-century American actresses
American film actresses
American stage actresses
20th-century African-American women
20th-century African-American people
21st-century African-American women
21st-century African-American people